Lessons Learned is a 2014 fantasy short film written and directed by Toby Froud.  The film's visuals were achieved widely through the use puppetry and animatronics.

Cast
William Todd-Jones as Boy
David Skelly as Digby
Bryonie Arnold as Spider Fate
Brandie Sylfae as Spider Fate
Scott Woodard as King
Mark Lewis as Grandpa

Production
Lessons Learned was written and directed by Toby Froud, son of the fantasy illustrators and puppet makers Brian and Wendy Froud. Toby, who had appeared as the baby Toby Williams in Jim Henson's Labyrinth, had developed an interest in puppetry from an early age.  The film was executive produced by Heather Henson, daughter of the puppeteers Jim and Jane Henson, who financed the film as part of her Handmade Puppet Dreams series.

To raise money for the film, Froud launched a Kickstarter campaign on July 2, 2013, with a goal of $25,000.  The campaign closed on August 1, 2013, having successfully raised $53,330.

Release
The film premiered in April 2014.  It also played at the Portland Film Festival in August 2014.

Awards

References

External links

Official film website

2014 short films
2014 films
2014 fantasy films
American short films
Puppet films
Films shot in Oregon
Kickstarter-funded films
2010s English-language films